Alive Again is a live album by Nuclear Assault released in 2003.

Track listing
 "Rise from the Ashes"
 "Brainwashed"
 "F#"
 "New Song"
 "Critical Mass"
 "Sin"
 "Betrayal"
 "Radiation Sickness"
 "Game Over"
 "Butt Fuck"
 "Trail of Tears"
 "Hang the Pope"

Musicians
 John Connelly - guitar and lead vocals
 Dan Lilker - bass and backing vocals
 Anthony Bramante - guitar
 Glenn Evans - drums
 Eric Paone - lead and rhythm guitars on 'Radiation Sickness'

References

2003 live albums
Nuclear Assault albums
SPV/Steamhammer live albums